David P. Barash (born 1946) is professor of psychology emeritus at the University of Washington. He has written, edited or co-authored 40 books, including ones on human aggression, peace studies, and the sexual behavior of animals and people. He received his bachelor's degree in biology from Harpur College, Binghamton University, and a Ph.D. in zoology from University of Wisconsin–Madison in 1970. He taught at the State University of New York at Oneonta and then accepted a permanent position at the University of Washington.

Works 
His book Natural Selections: Selfish Altruists, Honest Liars and Other Realities of Evolution is based on articles in the Chronicle of Higher Education. Madame Bovary's Ovaries: a Darwinian look at literature, a popular but serious presentation of Darwinian literary criticism, was jointly written with his daughter, Nanelle Rose Barash. He has also written over 230 scholarly articles and is a fellow of the American Association for the Advancement of Science. He has also received other honors.

Barash is working with his wife and fellow anti-nuclear activist, Judith Eve Lipton, on a book that analyzes and criticizes nuclear deterrence.

David P. Barash. Through a Glass Brightly, Oxford University Press, 2018
David P. Barash. Out of Eden: The Surprising Consequences of Polygamy, Oxford University Press, 2016
David P. Barash. Buddhist Biology: Ancient Eastern Wisdom Meets Modern Western Science, Oxford University Press, 2013
David P. Barash. Homo Mysterious: Evolutionary Puzzles of Human Nature, Oxford University Press, 2012; paperback, Oxford University Press, 2013
David P. Barash and Judith Eve Lipton. Payback: why we retaliate, redirect aggression and seek revenge, Oxford University Press, 2011
David P. Barash and Judith Eve Lipton. Strange Bedfellows: the surprising connection between sex, evolution and monogamy, Bellevue Literary Press, 2010
David P. Barash and Judith Eve Lipton. How Women Got Their Curves and Other Just-So Stories Columbia University Press, 2009
David P. Barash. Natural Selections: Natural Selections: selfish altruists, honest liars and other realities of evolution Bellevue Literary Press, 2007
David P. Barash and Nanelle R. Barash. Madame Bovary's Ovaries: a Darwinian look at literature Delacorte, 2005
David P. Barash. The Survival Game: how game theory explains cooperation and competition Henry Holt/Times Books, 2003
David P. Barash and Judith Eve Lipton. Making Sense of Sex: how genes gender influence our relationships. Island Press/Shearwater Books, 1997; paperback edition as Gender Gap: the biology of male-female differences, Transaction Publishers, 2001
Barash, D. & Lipton, J. (2001). The Myth of Monogamy – Fidelity and Infidelity in Animals and People. New York: Henry Holt and Company. 
Review by T. R Birkhead 
David P. Barash. Revolutionary Biology: the new, gene-centered view of life. Transaction Publishers, 2001
David P. Barash and Ilona Anne Barash. The Mammal in the Mirror: understanding our place in the animal world (W. H. Freeman, 2000;
David P. Barash. Beloved Enemies: our need for opponents. Prometheus Books, 1994
David P. Barash. The L Word: an unapologetic, thoroughly biased, long-overdue explication and celebration of liberalism William Morrow, 1992
David P. Barash. The Great Outdoors Lyle Stuart, 1989; in paper as Give Peas a Chance, Lyle Stuart, 1991
David P. Barash. The Hare and the Tortoise: the conflict between culture and biology in human affairs Viking, 1986; Penguin, 1987
translated into six languages
David P. Barash & Judith Eve Lipton. The Caveman and the Bomb: human nature, evolution, and nuclear war McGraw-Hill, 1985; Olive Branch Award nominee)
David P. Barash & Judith Eve Lipton. Stop Nuclear War! A handbook Grove Press, 1982;
(National Book Award nominee)
David P. Barash. Aging: an exploration/ Univ. of Washington Press, 1981;
translated into two languages
David P. Barash. The Whisperings Within: evolution and the origin of human nature Harper & Row, 1979; Penguin, 1980;
 translated into seven languages

Academic books

David P. Barash. Approaches to Peace Oxford University Press, 2000; 2nd edition, 2010; 3rd edition, 2013
David P. Barash and Charles Webel. Peace and Conflict Studies. Sage Publications, 2002; 2nd edition, 2008
Arthur Gandolfi, Anna S. Gandolfi, and David P. Barash. Economics as an Evolutionary Science: from utility to fitness. Transaction Publishers, 2002
David P. Barash. Understanding Violence Allyn & Bacon, 2001; 
David P. Barash. Ideas of Human Nature: from the Bhagavad Gita to sociobiology Prentice Hall,1998
David P. Barash. Introduction to Peace Studies Wadsworth, 1991
David P. Barash. Marmots: social behavior and ecology Stanford University Press, 1989
David P. Barash. The Arms Race and Nuclear War Wadsworth, 1986
David P. Barash. Sociobiology and Behavior Elsevier, 1977; 2nd, revised edition, 1982

References

External links
Official home page

1946 births
Living people
University of Wisconsin–Madison College of Letters and Science alumni
21st-century American psychologists
University of Washington faculty
Evolutionary psychologists
Harpur College alumni
20th-century American psychologists